Kista Strait is a strait between the Flat Islands and Jocelyn Islands in Holme Bay, Mac. Robertson Land, Antarctica. It was mapped by Norwegian cartographers from air photos taken by the Lars Christensen Expedition, 1936–37. The strait was first navigated by the site on which Australian National Antarctic Research Expeditions (ANARE) established Mawson Station.

References

Straits of Antarctica
Bodies of water of Mac. Robertson Land